The Phillip Street Theatre (succeeded by the Phillip Theatre) was a popular and influential Australian theatre and theatrical company, located in Phillip Street in Sydney that was active from 1954 and 1971 that became well known for its intimate satirical revue productions.

History

Founding
William Orr was a Scottish-born impresario from Glasgow who had a background as a director and theatre administrator in London before coming to Australia. Orr felt that there was a market in Australia for the new British theatre craze, the intimate topical satirical revue, and he pioneered the format in Sydney during 1954.    
 
Actor Gordon Chater praised Orr as a champion of Australian theatrical talent:

"To this day I think Bill Orr should have been honoured by this country for creating the first post-war entirely professional theatre employing all Australians – the dancers, musicians, actors, lyricists and composers were all Australian."

List of Performers
Between 1954 and 1971, Orr promoted a series at the Phillip Street Theatre that became known as the 'Phillip Street Revues' which featured many famous Australian performers.

Productions
In 1953 Orr premiered a small revue, Metropolitan Merry-Go-Round at the Metropolitan Church Hall in Reiby Place, Sydney. This production marked the first professional credit for writer John McKellar, Jerry Donovan and Lance Mulcahy, the three writer-performers had met at school and developed their writing skills in university revues. The trio worked together on several subsequent Phillip St productions and McKellar became the driving force behind most of the Phillip St revues of the '50s and '60s

Also at this time, British-born actor Gordon Chater was appearing in the Sydney production of Hugh Hastings' play Seagulls Over Sorrento. Chater's character did not appear in that play until the end of Act II, and because it was being sent up in the Metropolitan revue, Orr managed to convince Chater to come over to the Metropolitan to introduce the sketch, which was in the first half of the revue, giving Chater enough time to make it back for his performance in Sorrento.

Orr's next revue at the Metropolitan, Maid in Egypt was again written by McKellar, Donovan and Mulcahy, and starred Leonard Teale and Patty Martin.

Creation of the Phillip Street Theatre 
In 1954 Orr and his partner Eric Duckworth were given the use of the Workers' Education Hall in Phillip Street, Sydney, as a theatre, and they renamed it the Phillip Street Theatre. It was here that Orr staged his next revue, Top of the Bill (1954), written by McKellar, Donovan and Mulcahy and featuring Charles "Bud" Tingwell, Margot Lee and an (unknown) American actor, with Chater making a guest appearance in each half of the show. During rehearsals the American actor repeatedly turned up drunk, so he was sacked a week before the premiere and Chater was asked to step into the role. The revue included a sketches about the Petrov Affair, with Chater and Tingwell as David Jones floorwalkers and Chater in a solo turn as Australian dress designer "Pierre of Balmain" (a play on words that conflated the French fashion house Pierre Balmain and the Sydney suburb of Balmain, which was at that time a run-down working-class enclave). Orr planned to stage three shows a week, but the new revue proved a great success—within days they were playing six shows a week plus Friday and Saturday matinees, and in his memoir Chater recounted that "there were queues around the corner of Phillip Street down to Castlereagh, and the production ran for two months."

Orr established a board of directors for the Phillip Street Theatre that included author Morris West, journalist Betty Best, charity fundraiser Nola Dekyvere and (later) lawyer John Kerr. Despite the success of Top of the Bill and its follow-up Hat Trick (1955) the board decided that the next show would be a straight production of Hamlet, which flopped. This was followed by a production of Sheridan's comedy The Duenna, set to music by Julian Slade and directed by British director Lionel Harris, who had been brought to Australia to direct a local production that featured visiting British actors Lewis Casson, Sybil Thorndike, Ralph Richardson and (his wife) Meriel Forbes. Harris asked Chater to play the role of Mendoza and also cast the young Ruth Cracknell. The production was well-received but it was terminated in the middle of its run by the hall's owners, the Workers' Educational Association (WEA), who took legal action against the theatre company to regain use of the hall.

Orr's next production was another satirical revue, Two to One (1955), starring veteran Australian musical star Max Oldaker, with Wendy Blacklock and a rising young actor-comedian from Melbourne, Barry Humphries. A couple of years earlier, while touring country Victoria with a theatre company headed by playwright Ray Lawler, Humphries had amused his fellow actors with a parody of a middle-class Australian housewife; for the company's end-of-year revue he named her Edna Everage and played her in a sketch he wrote for the show, called "Olympic Hostess". Although he had originally assumed that his 'turn' as Edna was a one-off, he decided to revive "Olympic Hostess" for the Phillip Street revue and its success helped to launch what became a fifty-year career for the self-proclaimed "Housewife Megastar".

Orr's next successful revue was Around the Loop (1956) which again teamed Oldaker, Chater, Blacklock and Humphries, plus newcomer June Salter. Humphries revived the Edna character (for what he said would be the last time) and the revue proved to be a major hit, playing eight shows a week for 14 months. During this period Humphries was living near Bondi and while out walking one day he had a chance meeting with an elderly man who had a high, scratchy voice and a pedantic manner of speech; this encounter inspired the creation of another of Humphries' best-known and most enduring characters, pensioner Sandy Stone.

Move to the Phillip Theatre 
When the Phillip Street hall was demolished in 1961 (at the time of the Bobby Limb and Dawn Lake production Out on a Limb) Orr moved his company to the Australian Hall at 150 Elizabeth St, renaming it the Phillip Theatre. There he presented a string of successful revue productions, the best known of which was John McKellar's A Cup Of Tea, A Bex and A Good Lie Down (1965), the title of which immediately passed into the Australian vernacular. Other known productions included a local version of the landmark British satirical sketch show Beyond the Fringe (1962), Stop Press (1961) The Importance of Being Oscar (1964), Flaming Youth (1963) and At It Again.

The Mavis Bramston show
The topical satire featured in the Phillip St revues exerted a considerable influence on Australia's first satirical television comedy series, The Mavis Bramston Show (1964–68), and the Bramston show featured numerous cast and crew who had worked in these live revues, including Gordon Chater, Barry Creyton, June Salter, Wendy Blacklock, writer John McKellar and writer-producer James Fishburn.

Conversion to cinema venue
The Phillip Street revues ended in 1971 when the Phillip Theatre changed hands and became the Richbrooke then the Rivoli (when leased briefly by Hoyts), then the Mandarin Cinema, Mandolin and finally Dave's Encore. The building has now returned to its original form of the Australian Hall.

Second encore
Note that the Phillip Street Theatre, separately to Orr's Phillip Theatre, recommenced operations in 1963 following the completion of a 300-seat theatre within the office block which replaced the 1961 demolition. This new Phillip Street Theatre continued until 1989 with children's drama classes and productions such as Peter and Ellen Williams' 1988 production of their pantomime Cinderella, with Derek Williams as musical director.

References

Former theatres in Sydney
Theatre companies in Australia